Shane Byrne is the name of:

Shane Byrne (footballer) (born 1993), Irish footballer
Shane Byrne (motorcycle racer) (born 1976), British motorcycle road racer
Shane Byrne (rugby player) (born 1971), former Irish rugby union hooker